Mainz Hauptbahnhof ("Mainz main station", formerly known as Centralbahnhof Mainz) is a railway station for the city of Mainz in the German state of Rhineland-Palatinate. It is used by about 60,000 travelers and visitors each day and is therefore by far the busiest station in Rhineland-Palatinate. The station was a trial area for a CCTV scheme using automated face recognition.

History 

The current station was built as a central station from 1882 to 1884 according to the plans of Philipp Johann Berdellé (1838–1903) as part of the expansion of the city after the Franco-Prussian War.

Origins 

Under the Rheinschifffahrtsakte (Rhine navigation treaty) of 1831, Mainz lost its right to impose a stapelrecht (pile right, a medieval right apparently first granted by Charlemagne to some cities, including Mainz, to require river traders to unload goods in its marketplace for a specified number of days and offer them for sale or make payment in lieu) and thus its trading port and its high tariffs could be avoided.  On 13 April 1840 the Taunus Railway between Frankfurt, Mainz-Kastel and Wiesbaden was opened and took transit traffic and tourism away from Mainz.  On the other hand, Mainz was the largest city of the Grand Duchy of Hesse and was thus an attractive destination for the developing railway network. In Mainz, the local Hessian Ludwig Railway Company (Hessische Ludwigsbahn) obtained concessions to build railway lines from Mainz, beginning in 1845 with the Mainz–Ludwigshafen railway, on which construction began in 1847.  The completion of the line was delayed due to the Revolutions of 1848 to 23 March 1853.  The original Mainz station was built on land next to the Rhine outside the city wall between the Wood Tower, Fort Malakoff and today's  Museum of Ancient Seafaring, and opened in August 1853.

In December 1858 the Hessian Ludwig Railway opened a line to Aschaffenburg via the then state capital of Darmstadt, but it ended on the right Rhine bank above the Main delta as no bridge had been built over the Rhine.  Travelers had to cross the Rhine with their luggage on a train ferry.  Therefore, in 1860 the building of a permanent railway bridge began, which went into service on 20 December 1862 as the first permanent bridge over the Rhine at Mainz since Roman times.

On 17 October 1859 the Mainz-Bingen line opened from its own terminal station in Mainz, which was outside the Mainz fortress in the Gartenfeld ("garden field") (now Neustadt) between the Frauenlobstraße and Feldbergplatz, near where today's Grüne Brücke crosses Rheinallee.

In 1871 the Alzey–Mainz line of the Hessian Ludwig Railway opened to Alzey via Gonsenheim.

Planning 

In the course of the 19th Century the number of passengers steadily increased, as Mainz developed as the junction of lines to Darmstadt, Ludwigshafen, Aschaffenburg, Bingen and Frankfurt.  However, the terminal stations lay between the walls and the fortress and the Rhine bank, and this limited area did not permit an expansion of the railway facilities.  Already in 1858 the Mainzer Zeitung newspaper reported plans for a relocation of the stations.

The development of the town, extension and organization of the riverbank and railway development required a high measure of co-ordination in order to produce an acceptable outcome.  In 1873, Chief architect Eduard Kreyßig, who had replaced the former chief architect Laske in 1866, suggested  shifting the station to the west side of the city.  The approach lines had to be built in a large curve to the west of the city to reach the proposed station site. In addition a tunnel under the citadel was necessary.

Construction

The Mainz architect Philipp Johann Berdellé (1838–1903) created the station's entrance building in bright Flonheim sandstone in Italian neo-Renaissance with baroque and neoclassical elements. A jutting central section is framed by two lower side wings with arcades, which end in risalits. The building was opened ceremoniously on 15 October 1884.

Art in the building 

Berdellé set the emphasis of the graphic decorations on the entrances of the central building. Allegorical representations refer to the function of the building. On both sides of the entrance reliefs (produced by the Mainz sculptors Valentin Barth and Anton Scholl) display putti at play to indicate the way for arrivals and departures:
The departure sculpture is in the left section of the main building: in the left upper corner the word "billet" (ticket) can be recognized. It shows scenes on the topic of departure and parting at the station and includes a heavy suitcase.
The arrival sculpture is in the right section of the main building: here the putti disembark from the train and joyful arrival is portrayed. The heavy suitcase is carried away.

Station forecourt
Originally the forecourt surrounded a rondel and was planted with trees, lawns and flowers. It included a rail loop for horse trams and numerous carriages and hotel buses also served the station.

Station hall

The station hall was the longest in Europe when opened.  It was built, along with railway bridge over the Rhine, by the Süddeutschen Brückenbau-Actien-Gesellschaft, now MAN AG.  It was three hundred meters long  and 47 meters wide and constructed from cast and wrought iron, glass and corrugated iron with a surface area of approximately 14,000 square meters. The roof structure was supported by sixty wrought-iron columns.  The faces were locked with glass aprons up to the entry height of the courses.

First alteration

Part of the tunnel between the Hauptbahnhof and Mainz Süd was opened to the surface in the thirties in a make-work scheme, creating two tunnels.  A fire in the station's roof on 23 December 1934 caused limited damage, but it was decided to replace the whole roof.   The station was bombed on many occasions during World War II by the Royal Air Force and the United States Army Air Forces, but continued to operate.

Second alteration

In the course of the bombing of Mainz in World War II the Hauptbahnhof as important infrastructure was subject to several air raids. With the permission of the American and French military authorities trains began to operate on individual lines again and reconstruction began before the end of 1945.  The re-building of the station building and forecourt began in 1947.  The outside walls and the basic concept were maintained, but the groundplan was improved.

The Hauptbahnhof was enlarged, modernized and adapted for technical progress. The Mainz locomotive shed became one of the first to be "steam-free", when the last steam locomotive left it in 1959.  The station had previously been electrified.

Third alteration 

The largest recent change to the station is the building of a second double-track tunnel on the line to Römisches Theater station (formerly Mainz Süd) under the Kästrich.  The reorganization of the lines in the old tunnel has not been finished yet.

At a cost of about € 114 million over a five-year construction period to the end of 2003, the reception building and the station hall were reconditioned and partly rebuilt.  The platform entrance now leads across a high ramp, which gives step-free access via escalators and elevators from the reception hall to the platforms.  It spans four platforms and seven tracks. Three further terminal tracks are accessible from platform 1.  The area for businesses and restaurants was expanded by 3.800 m².

Services 
The station is used by about 55,000 travelers each day.  It is the terminus of Line S8:Wiesbaden Hbf–Mainz Hbf–Rüsselsheim–Frankfurt Hbf–Hanau Hbf; of the Rhine-Main S-Bahn and it is the start of the Mainbahn to Frankfurt Hbf.  It is served by  440 daily local and regional trains (StadtExpress, RE and RB) and 78 long-distance trains (IC, EC and ICE).

The station is an interchange point for the Mainz tramway network, and an important bus junction for the city and region (RNN, ORN and MVG).

Long distance

The following long-distance rail passenger services operate from Mainz Hauptbahnhof:

Regional

The following local passenger services operate from Mainz Hauptbahnhof:

References

Sources
 Eisenbahn in Hessen. Kulturdenkmäler in Hessen. Denkmaltopographie Bundesrepublik Deutschland, ed. vom Landesamt für Denkmalpflege Hessen, Theiss Verlag Stuttgart, 2005, 3 volumes at Schuber, 1.448 S., Bd. 2.1, S. 232f (Strecke 014). 
 Franz Dumont, Ferdinand Scherf, Friedrich Schütz (ed.): Mainz – Die Geschichte der Stadt. 2nd edition. Verlag Philipp von Zabern, Mainz 1999,  
 Stadt Mainz (ed.): Vierteljahreshefte für Kultur, Politik, Wirtschaft, Geschichte. Verlag Krach, 1981, ISSN 0720-5945 
 Heinrich Wohte (ed.): Mainz – Ein Heimatbuch. Verlag Johann Falk Söhne, Mainz 1928

External links
 

Rhine-Main S-Bahn stations
Hauptbahnhof
Renaissance Revival architecture in Germany
Railway stations in Germany opened in 1884